Michael Drew is a professor emeritus of chemistry at the University of Reading. He used to hold the position of head of physical chemistry. His main area of study centres on computational chemistry.

External links

British physical chemists
Academics of the University of Reading
Living people
Year of birth missing (living people)
Computational chemists